is a former Japanese football player.

Early life
Rakuyama was born in Uozu on August 11, 1980. Rakuyama graduated from Chukyo University.

Playing career
Rakuyama joined J1 League club JEF United Chiba in 2003. He got opportunities to play from first season and played many matches as midfielder from 2006. JEF United won the champions in 2005 and 2006 J.League Cup. In July 2008, he moved to J2 League club Sanfrecce Hiroshima. He played as substitute midfielder. Sanfrecce also won the champions in 2008 season and was promoted to J1. In 2010, he moved to Russian First Division club FC Khimki. In 2011, he moved to Chinese Super League club Shenzhen Ruby. Although the club was relegated to League One, he played many matches until 2013. He retired end of 2013 season.

Club statistics

References

External links

1980 births
Living people
Chukyo University alumni
People from Uozu, Toyama
Association football people from Toyama Prefecture
Japanese footballers
J1 League players
J2 League players
JEF United Chiba players
Sanfrecce Hiroshima players
FC Khimki players
Chinese Super League players
China League One players
Shenzhen F.C. players
Japanese expatriate footballers
Expatriate footballers in Russia
Expatriate footballers in China
Association football midfielders